Leptocypris konkoureensis is a species of cyprinid fish endemic to the Kakrima River in Guinea.

References

Leptocypris
Danios
Fish of Africa
Fish described in 1989